The Scout and Guide movement in Guatemala is served by:
 Asociación Nacional de Muchachas Guías de Guatemala, member of the World Association of Girl Guides and Girl Scouts
 Asociación de Scouts de Guatemala, member of the World Organization of the Scout Movement
 Scouts Independientes de Guatemala (Scouts Baden Powell de Guatemala), member of the World Federation of Independent Scouts
 Asociacion de Heraldos de Baden Powell

International Scouting units in Guatemala
In addition, there are American Boy Scouts in Guatemala City, linked to the Direct Service branch of the Boy Scouts of America, which supports units around the world.